Macrostomus is a genus of flies in the family Empididae.

Species
M. abdominalis Bezzi, 1905
M. acreanus Rafael and Cumming, 2015
M. albicaudatus Rafael and Cumming, 2015
M. alpinus Rafael & Cumming, 2006
M. amazonensis Rafael and Cumming, 2015
M. apicalis Bezzi, 1909
M. arcucinctus Bezzi, 1909
M. argyrotarsis Bezzi, 1909
M. barueri Smith, 1962
M. ciliaticosta Rafael & Cumming, 2006
M. cysticercus Smith, 1963
M. digitatus Smith, 1962
M. distinctipennis Smith, 1962
M. divisus Smith, 1962
M. dolichocerus Bezzi, 1905
M. dolichopterus Bezzi, 1909
M. falcatus Rafael and Marques, 2019
M. fasciventris (Curran, 1931)
M. ferrugineus (Fabricius, 1805)
M. flavus Rafael and Cumming, 2009
M. fulvithorax Curran, 1931
M. furcatus Rafael and Cumming, 2009
M. fuscithorax Rafael and Cumming, 2009
M. fusciventris Rafael and Cumming, 2009
M. grallatrix Bezzi, 1909
M. inflatus Rafael and Cumming, 2012
M. juri Smith, 1962
M. limbipennis Bezzi, 1909
M. lineatus Rafael & Cumming, 2006
M. longipennis Rafael and Cumming, 2009
M. macerrimus Bezzi, 1909
M. manauara Rafael and Cumming, 2010
M. melanothorax Rafael and Cumming, 2009
M. montanus Rafael and Marques, 2019
M. mundurucu Smith, 1962
M. mura Smith, 1962
M. nigriventris Macquart, 1846
M. nitidus Rafael and Cumming, 2012
M. occidentalis Rafael & Cumming, 2006
M. orthoneura Bezzi, 1905
M. pacaraima Rafael and Cumming, 2010
M. palliatus (Coquillett, 1902)
M. paraiba Rafael and Cumming, 2015
M. penai Rafael & Cumming, 2006
M. perpulchrus Bezzi, 1909
M. pictipennis Bezzi, 1909
M. pulchriventris Bezzi, 1905
M. rodriguezi Rafael and Marques, 2019
M. rotundipennis Bezzi, 1905
M. seticauda Smith, 1963
M. smithi Rafael and Cumming, 2010
M. tarsalis Rafael & Cumming, 2006
M. trifidus Rafael and Marques, 2019
M. trilineatus Rafael and Marques, 2019
M. trombetensis Rafael and Cumming, 2015
M. utinga Rafael and Cumming, 2010
M. variseta Smith, 1962
M. wiedemanni Smith, 1962
M. xavieri Rafael and Cumming, 2015

References

Empidoidea genera
Macrostomus